The 1930 United States Senate elections occurred in the middle of Republican President Herbert Hoover's term. The 32 seats of Class 2 were contested in regular elections, and special elections were held to fill vacancies. With the Great Depression beginning to take hold, Republican incumbents became unpopular, and Democrats picked up a net of eight seats, erasing the Republican gains from the previous election cycle. Republicans retained control of the U.S. Senate since Vice President Charles Curtis cast the tie-breaking vote. This was the first of four consecutive Senate elections during the Depression in which Democrats made enormous gains, achieving a cumulative pick-up of 34 seats.

In Louisiana, Democratic senator-elect Huey Long chose not to take his Senate seat until January 25, 1932 so he could remain as Governor of Louisiana.  The Republicans therefore retained the plurality of seats at the beginning of the next Congress.  With Vice President Charles Curtis (R) able to cast tie-breaking votes, the Republicans would have majority control with their 48 of the 96 seats.  That slim control was further weakened in the last months of the next Congress with several mid-term seat changes.

In Minnesota, Henrik Shipstead was not up for election in 1930. He was a former Republican who became a Farmer–Laborite in 1922.  Although the Farmer–Laborites would later merge with the Minnesota Democratic Party to form the Democratic–Farmer–Labor Party in 1944, Shipstead and his contemporaries were not aligned with either major party.  He would later rejoin the party in 1940.

Gains, losses, and holds

Retirements
Six Republicans and one Democrat retired instead of seeking re-election.

Defeats
Seven Republicans and five Democrats sought re-election but lost in the primary or general election.

Change in composition

Before the elections

After the elections

Race summary

Special elections during the 71st Congress 
In these special elections, the winner were seated during 1930; ordered by election date (then by state).

Elections leading to the 72nd Congress 
In these general elections, the winners were elected for the term beginning March 4, 1931; ordered by state.

All of the elections involved the Class 2 seats.

Closest races 
Ten races had a margin of victory under 10%:

Alabama

Arkansas

Colorado

Delaware 

Interim appointee Daniel O. Hastings was elected both to finish the current term and to the next term on the same November 4 ballot.

Delaware (regular)

Delaware (special)

Georgia

Idaho

Illinois

Iowa

Kansas

Kansas (regular)

Kansas (special)

Kentucky

Kentucky (regular)

Kentucky (special)

Louisiana

Maine

Massachusetts

Michigan

Minnesota

Mississippi

Montana

Nebraska 

| 
Hitchcock    Norris:

New Hampshire

New Jersey

New Jersey (regular)

New Jersey (special)

New Mexico

North Carolina

Ohio (special)

Oklahoma

Oregon

Pennsylvania (special)

Rhode Island 

Incumbent Republican Senator Jesse H. Metcalf successfully sought reelection to a 2nd term in office. , this is the last time a Republican has won the Class 2 Senate seat in Rhode Island, and it would be the last time a Republican would win any Senate seat in the state at all until John Chafee in 1976

South Carolina

South Dakota

Tennessee 

One-term Democrat Lawrence D. Tyson died August 24, 1929 and Democrat William Emerson Brock was appointed September 2, 1929 to continue the term, pending a special election.

Tennessee (special) 

Interim Democrat William Emerson Brock easily won election to finish the term.

Tennessee (regular) 

William Emerson Brock was not a candidate to the next term, instead choosing to return to his Chattanooga candy manufacturing business.  Instead, former Democratic congressman Cordell Hull was swept into the seat.

Hull was appointed United States Secretary of State and served there for 11 years, and in 1945, he was awarded the Nobel Peace Prize for "co-initiating the United Nations."

Texas

Virginia

West Virginia

Wyoming 

Six-term Republican Francis E. Warren had died November 24, 1929 and Republican Patrick J. Sullivan was appointed to continue the term, pending a special election in which he was not a candidate.

Wyoming (special)

Wyoming (regular)

See also
 1930 United States elections
 1930 United States House of Representatives elections
 71st United States Congress
 72nd United States Congress

Notes

References